These are the official results of the Men's 400 metres Hurdles event at the 2001 IAAF World Championships in Edmonton, Alberta, Canada. There were a total number of 42 participating athletes, with six qualifying heats, three semi-finals and the final held on Friday August 10, 2001 at 21:05h.

Medalists

Records

Summary
From the gun, Dai Tamesue was out fast, making up the stagger on Fabrizio Mori to his outside in lane 4 by the third hurdle.  By the fifth hurdle, Félix Sánchez in lane 5 managed to catch Tamesue, with Hadi Soua'an Al-Somaily not too far behind in lane 1.  Tamesue continued the pressure, regaining a slight lead on Sánchez, while Mori maintained the 1 metre gap while running a further distance around the turn.  With long strides, Al-Somaily managed to virtually triple jump 13 strides into the eighth hurdle, seizing the lead from Tamesue.  Both Tamesue and Al-Somaily began to struggle, their cadence was no longer what it had been.  Sánchez maintained his cadence and cruised past, with Mori less than a metre behind.  Mori challenged Sánchez to the line but couldn't get ahead.  Three metres back, Tamesue was able to regain his advantage over Al-Somaily for bronze.

Final

Semi-finals
Held on Wednesday 2001-08-08

Heats
Held on Wednesday 2001-08-07

See also
 1998 Men's European Championships 400m Hurdles (Budapest)
 2000 Men's Olympic 400m Hurdles (Sydney)
 2002 Men's European Championships 400m Hurdles (Munich)
 2004 Men's Olympic 400m Hurdles (Athens)

References
 Results

H
400 metres hurdles at the World Athletics Championships